The Taft-Peirce Manufacturing Company was a pioneering sewing machine company established in 1875 at Woonsocket, Rhode Island, United States. As the sewing machine industry gradually commoditized, Taft-Peirce leveraged its toolmaking capabilities to become a supplier of gauges, such as various kinds of go/no go gauges, to the manufacturing industries, and a supplier of engineering and toolroom work on a contract basis. The company was dissolved on 6 October 1995.

See also
 List of sewing machine brands

References

Further reading

Blackall, F. Steele Jr. "A History of the Taft-Peirce Manufacturing Company and its Predecessor Corporations...From April 2, 1875 to the Close of World War II"
Hall, Joseph Jr., ed. Biographical History of the Manufacturers and Businessmen of Rhode Island... (Providence: J.D. Hall, 1901), 76-77.

External links
 Taft-Peirce Manufacturing Company Summary Screen State of Rhode Island and Providence Plantations Office of the Secretary of State, Division Of Business Services, Providence RI 
 Taft-Peirce Manufacturing Company Records in: Rhode Island Historical Society, Manuscripts Division

Sewing machine brands